Ghyasuddin Ahmed, (1935 – 14 December 1971) was a Bengali educator.

Early life
Ahmed was born in the district of Narsingdi in 1935. He passed matriculation by obtaining eighth place from St. Gregory High School, Dhaka in 1950 and I.A. from Notre Dame College in 1952 by obtaining tenth place. He passed B.A. (Hons) and M.A. in history from Dhaka University in 1957.  In his university days, he was a chess champion and captain of the basketball team of S. M. Hall.

Career 
Ahmed joined Jagannath College (now Jagannath University) as a lecturer in the history department and later joined Dhaka University in 1958. He went to the United Kingdom with a Commonwealth Scholarship in 1964 and obtained an Honours degree in world history from the London School of Economics (LSE).

Role in liberation war
Ahmed collected medicine and food and delivered those to posts, such as Sufia Kamal’s house, which supplied freedom fighters for their training.

Death

Accused of helping in the liberation war of Bangladesh, he was taken to Dhaka Cantonment in 1971 for questioning. He was released after a few days. Then again on 14 December 1971, he was picked up from Mohsin Hall by the Pakistani paramilitary Al Badar forces. On 4 January 1972 his clothes and mutilated body were identified in Mirpur area.

On 3 November 2013, Chowdhury Mueen-Uddin, a Muslim leader based in London, and Ashrafuz Zaman Khan, based in the US, were sentenced in absentia after the court found that they were involved in the abduction and murders of 18 people - nine Dhaka University teachers including Ahmed, six journalists and three physicians – in December 1971.

See also
 1971 Bangladesh atrocities

References

1935 births
1971 deaths
Bangladeshi murder victims
University of Dhaka alumni
People murdered in Bangladesh
People killed in the Bangladesh Liberation War
Notre Dame College, Dhaka alumni
Academic staff of Jagannath University